John Joseph Harman AM (22 March 1932 – 27 February 1998) was an Australian politician who was a Labor Party member of the Legislative Assembly of Western Australia from 1968 to 1986, representing the seat of Maylands. He served as Speaker of the Legislative Assembly from 1983 to 1986.

Harman was born in Perth, and educated at various Catholic schools. After leaving school, he worked for a period as a clerk with the state government's Department of Lands Surveys, and then as a field officer with the Department of Native Welfare. A member of the Civil Service Association executive and a member of the Labor Party from 1960, Harman entered politics at the 1968 state election, defeating the sitting Liberal member Bob Marshall. After the 1971 election, which saw the election of a Labor government led by John Tonkin, he was appointed chief government whip. Following a cabinet reshuffle in May 1973, Harman was made Minister for Labour, Minister for Immigration, Minister for Price Control, and Minister for Consumer Protection, although he served only until Labor's defeat at the 1974 election. Harman remained a member of the Labor shadow ministry until 1981, serving under three leaders of the opposition (John Tonkin, Colin Jamieson, and Ron Davies). He was elected to the speakership after Labor's victory at the 1983 election, serving until his retirement from politics at the 1986 election. Harman subsequently served as state chairman of the Australian Bicentennial Authority, and in 1989 was made a Member of the Order of Australia (AM) for his work.

See also 
 Tonkin Ministry
 Tonkin Shadow Ministry

References

|-

|-

1932 births
1998 deaths
Australian Labor Party members of the Parliament of Western Australia
Australian trade unionists
Members of the Order of Australia
Members of the Western Australian Legislative Assembly
Speakers of the Western Australian Legislative Assembly
Politicians from Perth, Western Australia
20th-century Australian politicians